Harpstedt is a municipality in the district of Oldenburg, Lower Saxony, Germany, south of Bremen (30 km).

Harpstedt is also the seat of the Samtgemeinde ("collective municipality") Harpstedt.

Harpstedt was first mentioned in 1203 as "Harpenstede". In 2015 it had 4682 inhabitants.

References 

Oldenburg (district)